Douglas C. Peace (April 4, 1919 – December 12, 2000) was a Canadian cyclist who competed at the 1936 Summer Olympics. In Berlin he competed in the men's sprint event, but was eliminated in the second round against eventual bronze medalist Louis Chaillot. He competed out of the Maple Leaf Wheelmen Club of Toronto and was a four-time national cycling champion.

References

1919 births
2000 deaths
Canadian male cyclists
Cyclists at the 1936 Summer Olympics
Olympic cyclists of Canada
20th-century Canadian people